Muhammad Allal al-Fassi (ⵄⵍⵍⴰⵍ ⵍⴼⴰⵙⵉ) (January 10, 1910 – May 13, 1974), was a Moroccan politician, writer, poet and Islamic scholar.

Early life and exile
He was born in Fes and studied at the University of Al-Qarawiyyin. His father was a Judge (Qadi) as well as his uncle Abdallah Al-Fassi (1871-1930) who was in charge of his education. For many years, his professor and mentor was Abdeslam Serghini. He started his anti-French political activities very early on in 1926, immediately after joining the University of Al-Qarawiyyin, which would lead to his expulsion from the university in 1927, and banishment from the city of Fes by the French colonial administration who decided to confine him in Taza. He finished his studies at the Zawiya Nassiriya, a Zawiya historically known for its intellectual potency and hostility to European invasions of Morocco. In 1931, he was allowed back to Fes, and he again picked up his political agitations in the city, and started campaigning and giving nationalistic speeches which gathered success and emotions amongst the masses who admired his eloquence. This prompted the French to exile him again in 1933, this time to Geneva where he met the Lebanese political leader Shakib Arslan, and would assist him in his historical works on the Maghreb region. Arsalan, already in contact with young Moroccan nationalists in Switzerland such as the future PM Ahmed Balafrej, mentored him in political organization, and introduced him to many political contacts, and also publicized his name in his various journalistic articles and correspondences. Allal came back to Morocco in 1934, and founded the kutlat al-'amal al-watani , Comité d'Action Marocaine (CAM) and the first Moroccan-led workers' union in 1936, and in December of that year officially petitioned the French Colonial Residence in Rabat demanding a number of reforms. This led the French authorities to decide to disband and persecute the members of his political organization, and in 1937, exiled him to the small town of Port-Gentil in Gabon where he would remain for the next nine years until 1946, receiving very little information about the affairs of the outside world during that period.

While he was in exile, the CAM was renamed in 1944 as the Istiqlal Party, which became the nationalist  party and the driving force after the Moroccan Army of Liberation (jaish at-tahreer), with many Berbers, in the Moroccan struggle for independence from France.

Istiqlal party and post-independence
He broke with the party in the mid-1950s, siding with armed revolutionaries and urban guerrillas who waged a violent campaign against French rule, whereas most of the nationalist mainstream preferred a diplomatic solution. In 1956, as Morocco gained independence, he reentered the party, and famously presented his case for reclaiming territories that have once been Moroccan in the newspaper al-Alam. In 1959, after the left-wing UNFP split off from Istiqlal, he became head of the party.

In 1962, he briefly served as Morocco's Minister of Islamic Affairs. He was elected to the Parliament of Morocco in 1963, and served there as an Istiqlal deputy. He then went on to become a main leader within the opposition during the 1960s and the start of the 1970s, campaigning against King Hassan II's constitutional reforms that ended parliamentary government. He died of a heart attack on 13 May 1974, on a visit to Romania where he was scheduled to meet with Nicolae Ceaușescu.

Literature

In 1925 Al-Fassi published his first book of poems. In 1954 his The Independence Movements in Arab North Africa was published, a translation of a book he wrote in Arabic in 1948.

Personal life  
Both of Allal al-Fassi's daughters were married to leading figures of Moroccan politics; ex-Prime Minister and longtime Istiqlal party Secretary General Abbas El Fassi, and Mohamed El Ouafa ex-Minister and vocal dissident figure within the party.

See also
Allal al Fassi Dam

References

External links
World biography Biography of Mohammed Allal al-Fassi
Encyclopedia.com Biography of Mohammed Allal al-Fassi

See also

Mohammed al-Mokhtar Soussi

1910 births
1974 deaths
20th-century Moroccan poets
Istiqlal Party politicians
National Union of Popular Forces politicians
Government ministers of Morocco
Members of the House of Representatives (Morocco)
People from Fez, Morocco
University of al-Qarawiyyin alumni
Moroccan exiles
Moroccan nationalists
Moroccan Arab nationalists
20th-century poets
Moroccan expatriates in Switzerland